Jorge Wilstermann International Airport is a high elevation international airport serving Cochabamba, the capital of the Cochabamba Department of Bolivia. The facility is named after Jorge Wilstermann, an early Bolivian commercial aviator.

Operators 
On 1 March 1997 the Government of Bolivia entered into a 25-year contract with Airport Group International to operate the three largest airports in Bolivia – El Alto International Airport in La Paz, Jorge Wilstermann Airport and Viru Viru International Airport in Santa Cruz de la Sierra. Servicios de Aeropuertos Bolivianos Sociedad Anonima (SABSA) was created to operate the concession. In 1999 Airport Group International was purchased by TBI plc and, in 2004, Spain's Abertis/AENA purchased TBI and operated until 2013 when the Government ordered the nationalization of SABSA, the company Airport Group International created. SABSA Nacionalizada operates the airport since 2013.

SABSA has been substituted in March of 2022 by the newly established government agency Navegación Aérea y Aeropuertos Bolivianos (NAABOL).  This state-owned agency now manages the airports in Bolivia.

Airlines and destinations

See also
Transport in Bolivia
List of airports in Bolivia

References

External links 
Abertis Airports
Cochabamba Airport at OurAirports

Cochabamba Airport at FallingRain

Airports in Cochabamba Department